The Battle of Gondra occurred during the Chaco War between the Bolivian 4th Division, "The Brave Fourth", and the Paraguayan 1st Division, "The Iron Division", stationed around Fort Gondra, from 11 to 15 July 1933, in the aftermath of the Second Battle of Nanawa. The 1st Division enveloped the Bolivian 4th after a series of assaults through the dense woods southwest of Gondra. The Bolivian 34th infantry and the "Lanza" cavalry regiment, led by captain German Busch, fought a rearguard action which allowed the encircled troops to withdraw northward, toward Campo 31, an open field leading to Alihuatá. Meanwhile, the 3rd "Pérez" infantry regiment built up a new blocking position in the eastern part of Campo Vía, a dried bed six kilometers west of Gondra, which prevented any further Paraguayan advance. On 15 July, the Bolivian troops retreated unmolested from the pocket, carrying out all their heavy equipment with them.

Gondra Tunnel
On May 10, 1933, it is carried out in the GONDRA sector, one of the most risky and sensational maneuvers of the Chaco War: the raid of Paraguayan troops through a tunnel to get out in the rear of the enemy. Soldiers located in Fort Gondra stayed on site for more than a month, tirelessly, semi-naked, exhausted and some even malaria patients. The patriotism of the combatants enlightened them to conceive and perform exploits that seem unlikely in order to derail the extraordinary pressure of Bolivians. In view of the proximity of both trenches and the enormous danger that this approach meant for Paraguayan troops, a job began to go out to the Bolivian rear of a subway. A great work that may not have parallel in the warrior history of other peoples, given the precarious means available compared to its great conception and execution, was undoubtedly the construction of the famous GONDRA tunnel, joining our positions with the rear of Bolivians with an extensive underground below the trenches.

It was devised by Cabo Bernabé Mendoza Duré, whose initiative was informed by the commander of the Primera División, Lieutenant Colonel Rafael Franco, who despite all the difficulties that the projected work gave approval and on April 28, 1933 , with primitive tools, yatagan, can dishes in the form of shovels and bags to get the removed land began the risky work of projected tunnel execution. It was very difficult to get any idea of the enormous sacrifice it meant for the executors of work, digging the entrance, expanding the opening, carrying the land removed, ensuring the stability of the top and delve the excavation to pass it under the trenches. And everything should be done without the enemy realizing.

The risky executors of the interesting operation were the components of a special detachment under Lieutenant's orders. Julius César Zarza and Private Ricardo Give them from the mortar section of Lt. Alex Franco. Those who had to take advantage of this dangerous path to break into the Bolivian field, at the other end of the tunnel were 3 Rifle company, under the command of Lieutenant Pantaleón Aguirre, Salvador Re and Salvador Funes. The Company of Lt. Funes should move through the tunnel and the other two over the surface. That celebrated May 10 woke up with a slight drizzle. Before dawn, Private Ricardo Dávalos was the first to be in the rear of the unsuspecting Bolivians who slept quietly under their nets. Great was the confusion of Bolivians and impossible reaction to such an unexpected assault.

The victory was complete but it cost Paraguay the painful loss of Lt. Pantaleon Aguirre, hero of many previous days who paid with his life so memorable feat. In his tribute since that day, the vigilante named ′′ Avenue Pantaleón Aguirre ′′ was given to the Picada Gondra-Pirizal. The next day May 11, Bolivians spare parts of their big surprise furiously fought back by regaining their positions. In that action Lost his life too. Juan R Reserve. Blacksmiths. D 1 troops commanded by TCnel. Franco continued to comply with heroic denuedo the order of ′′ tenacious defense ′′ taught by Colonel Estigarribia, until the great maneuver known as the Battle of Gondra was ordered from July 11 to 15, 1933, a few days after Nanawa's thundering defensive win.

References
Escobar, Ramiro (1982). Ráfagas de metrallas, sangre en los pajonales: Guerra del Chaco. El Gráfico, Asunción. 
 Farcau, Bruce W. (1996). The Chaco War: Bolivia and Paraguay, 1932-1935. Greenwood Publishing Group, p. 135-136. 
Querajazu Calvo, Roberto. Masamaclay, historia de la guerra del Chaco, Segunda edición 
Yegros, Fulgencio. Gondra inmortal 

Battles of the Chaco War
July 1933 events
Conflicts in 1933
History of Presidente Hayes Department